QS-21 is a purified plant extract used as a vaccine adjuvant. It is derived from the soap bark tree (Quillaja saponaria), which is native to the countries of Chile, Peru, and Bolivia. The crude drug (Quillajae cortex) is imported from Peru and Chile.

The extract contains water-soluble triterpene glycosides, which are members of a family of plant-based compounds called saponins. It has been tested as an adjuvant in various vaccines in attempts to improve their efficacy. It is believed to enhance both humoral and cell-mediated immunity.

Isolation of QS-21 destroys the soap bark tree, which has resulted in regulation of the tree by the governments where it is grown. A semi-synthesis strategy relies on purifying the prosapogenin (triterpene and branched trisaccharide) part of the molecule and adding the rest of QS-21 synthetically; this is reported to increase the yield by 2 orders of magnitude. This semi-synthetic approach has also facilitated experimentation with alternative acyl chain compositions.  

QS-21 has undergone clinical evaluation as an additive for various trial vaccines, including those for HIV, malaria and cancer. , it had been tested in more than 3000 patients in 60 clinical trials.  It is a component of the Shingrix vaccine.

QS-21 (Matrix M) is a critical, saponin-derived immunologic adjuvant for the manufacturing of the Novavax COVID-19 vaccine. The addition of QS-21 triterpene-glycosides in form of liposomes is enhancing both humoral and cellular immunogenicity. Agenus Inc. is the sole US-manufacturer of an FDA-approved, patented extract. Supplies are tightly controlled, and the US has invoked the US Defense Production Act to preserve vaccine raw materials for its own companies.

See also
Quillaia

References

External links 
 Quillaja extract, other uses

Adjuvants
Saponins
Triterpene glycosides